National Route 298 is a national highway of Japan connecting Wakō, Saitama and Ichikawa, Chiba in Japan, with a total length of . Much of the route is concurrent with the Tokyo Gaikan Expressway, Tokyo's middle ring road.

History
Route 298 was designated on 1 April 1970 from Toda to Ichikawa. On 1 April 1982 the road was extended to Wakō.

References

National highways in Japan
Ring roads in Japan
Roads in Chiba Prefecture
Roads in Saitama Prefecture
Roads in Tokyo